This is a list of supermarket chains in Africa.

Algeria

Angola
 Intermarket
 AngoMart
 AngoMart Mais
 Fresmart
 Nossa Casa
 Bompreço
 Continente
 Kero 
 Maxi
 Megamart
 Nosso Super Supermarkets
 OK
 Shoprite
 Usave

Benin
 Attidza
 CBND
 Erevan Hypermarché
 l'Étoile
 Mayfair
 Megamart
 Starlight
 Unidis
 Yamaya Supermarché

Botswana
 Checkers
 Choppies Supermarkets 
 Friendly (OK franchise)
 Megamart
 OK Foods Supermarket
 OK Grocer
 OK Minimark
 OK Value
 Pick 'n Pay
 Shoppers
 Shoprite
 Spar
 USave
 Woolworths
 Shoprite hihihihahaha

Burkina Faso
 Marina Market
Le Bon Samaritain
Scimas
La surface
Les Bons amis

Burundi
 Au Bon Prix
 Boucherie Nouvelle 
 Idéal
 T-2000 Supermarkets (Chinese)

Cameroon

 Eco Marché
 Ecoprix
 Le Bon Point
 Leader Price
 Super U
 Carrefour
 Casino

Canary Islands
 Tu Alteza
 DinoSol

Cape Verde
 Calu e Angela
 Leader Price

Central African Republic
 Dias Freres
 Groupe Kamach
 Kanko

Chad
 Alimentation Générale
 Alimentation La Tchadienne
 La Gastronomie
 Modern Market

Comoros
 Carrefour Webstore

Congo
Casino Supermarché
Good Market
Guenin
La Cité
Metraco
Regal Congo
Score

Cote d'Ivoire
 Casino
 Civadis
 Leader Price
 Lulu Hypermarket
 Prosuma
 Sococé

Democratic Republic of the Congo
 Kin Marché
 City Market
 Extra Food
 Hyper Psaro
 Megastore
Shoprite (South Africa)
 Supermarché First
 Jambo Mart

Egypt

Equatorial Guinea
 AJM Supermarkets
 EGTC Supermarkets
 Martinez Hermanos
 Sogech

Eritrea
 Wikianos Supermarket

Ethiopia
 Shoa Shopping Center
 Abadir Supermarkets
 Alle Supermarkets
 Fantu Supermarkets
 Leonardo Supermarkets
 Novis Supermarkets
 Savemore Supermarkets

Gabon
 Casino Supermarkets
 Géant Casino-Mbolo
 Prix Import
 San Gel
 Score
 SuperGros
 Viga Supermarkets

The Gambia
 Maroun's Supermarkets
 Safeway Supermarkets
 St. Mary's Food and Wine Supermarkets

Ghana
 A&C Shopping
 Kwatsons
 Lulu Hypermarket
 Melcom Stores
 Palace
Shoprite (South Africa)
 Woolworths
 Tesbury Ghana

Guinea
 RS GROUPE 
 Babex
 Hyper Bobo
 Leader Price

Kenya

Lesotho
OK
Pick 'n Pay
Shoprite

Liberia
 Exclusive Supermarkets
 Monoprix Supermarkets
 Stop 'n' Shop Supermarkets

Libya
 Monoprix
 Price Club

Madagascar
 Cap 3000
 Cecomora
 Leader Price
 Liantsoa
 Score Supermarkets
Shoprite

Malawi
Pick n Pay Stores
Shoprite
SPAR
Chipiku
Superior Food Market

Mali
 ALS
 Le Mini Prix
 Seme Sugu

Mauritania
 Eco Marché
 Generale Alimentaire
 Le Bon Choix
 Salam

Mauritius
 Super U (Système U) and U Express
 Intermart Hyper (Partner of Intermarché-France).
 Jumbo (hypermarkets)
 Winner's supermarkets
 King Savers
 Lolo 
Food Lover's Market
 Dreamprice http://www.dreamprice.mu/
 Savemart
 GSR supermarket (Store 2000, Popo Supermarket, etc., ...)  http://www.gsrextraa.com/nos-supermarches
 Way supermarket (Londonway)

Former
 Pick 'n Pay operated 3 supermarkets in Mauritius between 2010 and 2014.
 Spar (all 5 Spar supermarkets replaced by Jumbo and Jumbo Express in 2019)
 Monoprix
 Smart
 Escale
 Shoprite Hyper (operated in Mauritius since 2002 but closed and were replaced by Winner's in 2020)

Morocco

Mayotte
Hypermarché Cora
 Score
 Shopi (Carrefour)
 Sodicash
 Sodifram
 HyperDiscount
 SuperDiscount

Mozambique
 KK Supermarkets
 Lulu Hypermarkets
 Pick 'n Pay Stores
 Royal Group Supermarkets
 Shoprite
 SPAR
 Taurus Supermarkets 
 Woolworths

Namibia
 Foodzone
 Checkers
 Hypersave
 Devland Metro Cash & Carry
 Sentra
 OK Grocer
Shoprite
SPAR
 Woermann Brock
 Woermann Supermarkets

Niger
 Haddad Supermarkets
 Marina Market
 Minimarket Azar

Nigeria

Marketsquare Supermarkets

Réunion
 Carrefour
 Casino Supermarché
 Champion
 Cora
 Géant
 Leader Price
 Marché U
 Score
 Super U
 Superette BRP
 A

Rwanda
 Foreign owned supermarket chains
 T-2000 Supermarkets (Chinese)

 Locally owned supermarket chains
 Crystal Mini Market 
 Simba Supermarkets
 BIG Supermarket (Be Indangamirwa Generation Supermarket)
 SAWA City Supermarket
 my250 Supermarket

São Tomé and Príncipe
 Grande Mundo

Senegal
 Auchan
 Belle Viande 
 Casino Supermarkets
 Dia
 Diop
 Eden's
 La Casa Italiana
 Score Supermarkets
 Societe Commerciale Dame Ndiaye

Seychelles
 Grocers Supermarkets Pty Ltd, Orion Mall, Mahe
 Kannus Supermarkets
 Seychelles Trading Corporation (STC)

Sierra Leone
 Monoprix

Somalia
 Al Osmani
 Carwada Bilan
 Daarasalaam
 Dool
 Father
 Midnimo
 Mama Taslim Grocery Store

South Africa

South Sudan
 JIT Mart - Juba Town (Mega) Branch and Yei Road Branch. Biggest Supermarket Chain in South Sudan
 Uchumi Supermarkets - In development
 Phoenicia Supermarket
 VAMP Supermarket
 Amen Supermarket
 AFRI General Trading Ltd (AFRI Shopping Centre)

Eswatini
OK
Shoprite
Pick 'n Pay
SPAR
Easy Buy

Tanzania
 Sifamart Supermarkets 
 Shoppers Supermarkets
 Shrijees Supermarkets
 TSN Supermarket
 Village Supermarkets
 Viva Marche Supermarket
 SPAR
 Mr Price
 Woolworths
 SafeWay Food Stores, Mikocheni/Mbweni
 Shoprite

Togo
 Agroboss
 Assan's
 Champion
 CitiMart
 Cora
 De La Paix
 Eco Shop
 Global Mart
 King Cash
 Supermarche du Pont
 Leader Price
 Ramco

Tunisia
 Auchan (opening soon)
 Cady Supermarchés
 Carrefour
 Carrefour Market
 Champion
 Magasin Général
 Monoprix (Monoprix)
 Promogro
 Aziza

Uganda

Zambia

Pick 'n Pay
Shoprite
SPAR
Choppies
Food lovers Market
Mass Stores
Melisa supermarkets
Cheers
24seven
Jumbo
Home essential
Zambeef
Zmart

Zimbabwe
 Choppies
 OK
Pick 'n Pay
SPAR
 TM
 Mfs
 ING-CO
 Greens
 Food Lovers Market
 Fortwell
 Gain

Notes